The 601 Assault Helicopter Battalion (Spanish: Batallón de Helicópteros de Asalto 601) is a helicopter unit of the Argentine Army.

Description 
This battalion is the main helicopter unit of the Argentine Army Aviation and is based at Campo de Mayo, Buenos Aires. The unit is composed by Bell UH-1H and Aerospatiale Puma helicopters. It is organised in two assault companies.

The battalion works closely with the infantry unit 601 Air Assault Regiment (Spanish: Regimiento de Asalto Aéreo 601), also based at Campo de Mayo.

History 
The unit took part in the Falklands War in 1982 with its original name "601 Combat Aviation Battalion" (Batallón de Aviación de Combate 601).

Inventory

See also
Rapid Deployment Force
601 Air Assault Regiment

References

External links 
 Argentine Army Aviation Official website
 Official website
 Article in "La Nación" newspaper

Army units and formations of Argentina
Military units and formations of Argentina in the Falklands War
Airborne units and formations of Argentina
Army aviation units and formations
Military units and formations established in 1970